Allan Bradley FRS is a British geneticist at the Wellcome Trust Sanger Institute.

Education
Bradley was educated at the University of Cambridge where he earned Bachelor of Arts, Master of Arts and PhD degrees in genetics from Trinity College, Cambridge gained while working in the laboratory of Martin Evans.

Career
Following his PhD, Bradley was appointed assistant professor at Baylor College of Medicine, beginning in 1987 where he was also a Searle Scholar in 1988. Bradley was appointed a Howard Hughes Medical Institute Investigator in 1993 and director of the Wellcome Trust Sanger Institute, from October 2000 (preceded by John Sulston) to April 2010, succeeded by Michael Stratton.

Awards and honours
Bradley won a 1994 DeBakey Award and was elected a Fellow of the Royal Society (FRS) in 2002. His certificate of election reads:

References

British geneticists
Alumni of Trinity College, Cambridge
Members of the European Molecular Biology Organization
Baylor College of Medicine faculty
Fellows of the Royal Society
Living people
Wellcome Trust
Howard Hughes Medical Investigators
Year of birth missing (living people)